Anil Ramesh Dave (born 19 November 1951) is a former judge at the Supreme Court of India and the current Executive-Chairman of the National Legal Services Authority. Before being elevated to the Supreme Court of India, he was Chief Justice of Andhra Pradesh High Court and Bombay High Court.

Career
He enrolled as an Advocate on 25 July 1976 and started practicing in various matters. He served as a Solicitor to the Government of Gujarat, Additional Government Pleader to Gujarat High Court and part-time Lecturer in Sir L.A. Shah Law College. He was appointed Additional Judge to the Gujarat High Court on 18 September 1995 and confirmed as Permanent Judge on 18 June 1997. Thereafter he was transferred to Andhra Pradesh High Court as the Chief Justice 7 January 2008. While holding the post of Chief Justice of High Court of Judicature at Hyderabad, he served as the Patron and Chairman of the Advisory Council of International Centre for Alternative Dispute Resolution (ICADR), Regional Centre, Hyderabad and Chancellor of NALSAR University of Law, Hyderabad. On 11 February 2010 he was transferred to Bombay High Court and from there he was elevated as Judge to Supreme Court of India on 30 April 2010. He retired as Judge of the Supreme Court of India on 19 November 2016.

References

1951 births
Living people
Justices of the Supreme Court of India
Place of birth missing (living people)
Chief Justices of the Bombay High Court
Judges of the Gujarat High Court
20th-century Indian judges
21st-century Indian judges